Dimethyl adipate is the organic compound with the formula (CH2CH2CO2CH3)2.  It is a colorless oily liquid.  Although the main commercial interest in adipates is related to the production of nylons, this diester is used as a plasticizer, a solvent for paint stripping and resins, and a pigment dispersant.

Preparation
Dimethyl adipate is prepared by esterification of adipic acid with methanol.  Less conventional routes include the hydroesterification of butadiene and the carbonylation of 1,4-dimethoxy-2-butene.

It reacts with concentrated ammonia to give the diamide (CH2CH2C(O)NH2)2.

Toxicity
Esters of adipic acid exhibit low acute toxicities in animal models. The LD50 of this dimethyl ester is estimated at 1800 mg/kg (rat, i.p.).

References

Adipate esters
Methyl esters
Plasticizers
Ester solvents